The Jufang Hall is a historical building in Nantou City, Nantou County, Taiwan.

History
The building was originally built in 1922 as Nantou District Produce Exhibition. In 1945 after World War II, the building was used to station troops and it was also rented out as a hotel. In 1951, the health center of Nantou County began its operation in the building until it was relocated in 1960. The Nantou County Library was then moved to the building until 1982 when Nantou County Culture Center took over its place. In 1983, the hall was renovated by  Nantou City Government and set up as Longquan Nursery. The nursery was damaged by the 921 earthquake on 21 September 1999. Soon after that, the Executive Yuan approved an approximate NT$3 million of public facility restoration funds to repair the hall. The building was reopened as Jufang Hall on 27 August 2001.

Architecture
The building was built with a European architecture style.

See also
 List of tourist attractions in Taiwan

References

2001 establishments in Taiwan
Buildings and structures completed in 1922
Buildings and structures in Nantou County
Tourist attractions in Nantou County